Sailesh Gulabani is an Indian television actor. He is known for portraying the role of Vibhishan in ‘Siya Ke Ram’  and Deepak on Aap Ke Aa Jane Se that airs on Zee TV.

Career
Gulabani began his career in 2001 when he appeared in the music video of "Dekha Hai Teri Aankhon Ko" by the Aryans. Following Pankaj Udhas's "Khuda Bachaye" music video. In 2008, he was cast in the serial Jeevan Saathi as Ishaan Solanki and Kkavyanjali as Nihaal Nanda. A year later, he bagged the role of Abhay on Sony TV's Ladies Special. In 2012, he was cast in Sajda Tere Pyaar Mein as Sameer. In 2013, he starred in an episode of CID. In 2013 and 2015, he guest-starred in the episodic roles of Namit and Gautam in Savdhaan India. In 2014, he was cast in the serial Aur Pyaar Ho Gaya as Pratap. In 2016, he joined the mythological show Siya Ke Ram as Vibhishan. In late 2017, he joined Zee TV's new show Aap Ke Aa Jane Se as the recurring character of Deepak. As well as Shaktipeeth ke Bhairav as Indira. He also made appearance in SAB TV's show Baalveer Returns as Parikshak, a negetive character.

Personal life
He married his longtime girlfriend actress Ashita Dhawan on 20 January 2010. They have 2 kids together, twins Arhmaan and Amaira.

Television

References

External links 

21st-century Indian male actors
Living people
Indian male television actors
Male actors in Hindi television
Indian male models
Male actors from Mumbai
Year of birth missing (living people)
Actors from Mumbai